The 2006 EuroBasket Division C was the third-ranked tier (lowest) of the bi-annual EuroBasket competition. The winner of this tournament was Azerbaijan.

Group phase

Group A

Group B

Final round

Classification games for 5th to 8th places
Malta 61 – 71 Wales
Gibraltar 54 – 74 San Marino

Placings 7th and 8th
Malta 55 – 60 Gibraltar

Placings 5th and 6th
Wales 66 – 71 San Marino

Final standings

External links
 Results from FIBA-Europe

2006
2005–06 in European basketball
International sports competitions hosted by Albania
2006 in Albanian sport